Lukáš Pazdera (born 6 March 1987) is a Czech football player, who currently play for 1. FK Příbram as a defender. He made his Gambrinus liga debut for Zlín against Brno on 5 August 2007.

Career

Club career
On 9 January 2020, Pazdera moved to Czech First League club 1. FK Příbram on a deal until the summer 2021.

References

External links

1987 births
Living people
Czech footballers
Czech First League players
FC Fastav Zlín players
FC Baník Ostrava players
1. FK Příbram players
Association football defenders